Timaima Rosi Lulutai Ravisa (born 1 May 1988) is a Fijian rugby sevens and rugby league player who played for the New Zealand Warriors in the NRL Women's Premiership.

Playing career

Rugby sevens
Ravisa was selected as a member of the Fijiana sevens team for the 2016 Summer Olympics in Brazil.

Rugby league
In 2019, Ravisa and her Fiji sevens teammate Roela Radiniyavuni relocated to Auckland to play rugby league for the Richmond Rovers.

On 10 July 2019, she joined the New Zealand Warriors NRL Women's Premiership.

Rugby union 
Ravisa was named in the Fijiana Drua squad for the 2022 Super W season. She was selected for the Fijiana squad to the 2021 Rugby World Cup in New Zealand.

References

External links

NRL profile

1988 births
Living people
Fiji women's national rugby league team players
Rugby sevens players at the 2016 Summer Olympics
Olympic rugby sevens players of Fiji
Fiji international rugby sevens players
Fijian female rugby league players
Fijian female rugby union players
New Zealand Warriors (NRLW) players
Fiji international women's rugby sevens players
Fiji women's international rugby union players